The Bergen Wave (in Norwegian: Bergensbølgen) is an expression often used by Norwegian media regarding the city of Bergen, Norway, as a platform for the development of modern music, illustrating a period in time of a new generation of artists from Bergen "taking over" the musical landscape in Norway.

About
The expression was initially used in the early 1990s then re-emerged several times throughout the 2000s. The "Bergen Wave" is most definitely a name coined by the mass media (the artists themselves are normally not too fond of the term, and it has become somewhat of a cliché) but at least the frequent use of the expression during the last 20+ years says something about the strength of the music scene in the city.

Several artists from the "Bergen Wave" gained international breakthroughs, which was uncommon for Norwegian music at that time.  Much of this success came from the focus that particularly British music press put on bands such as Röyksopp and Kings of Convenience and on the small record label Tellé Records. Many of the artists were connected to this label, owned by prominent Bergen Wave figure Mikal Telle. Common denominators between the artists are the independent approach - relying more on networking and word-of-mouth reputation than on the aid of major music labels for their breakthrough. Many of the bands also share a low-key melancholic tone, regardless if it is electronic dance music or conventional guitar based pop.

Towards the end of the 1990s, Tellé Records and its sub-labels started releasing singles by then unknown artists such as Röyksopp, Annie, Ralph Myers & The Jack Herren Band, Erot and Kings of Convenience. Intriguingly, a majority of the singles were picked up by music press and bigger labels abroad, and within a couple of years all of the names mentioned above were international stars on the underground scene. Röyksopp and King of Convenience broke into the mainstream. Suddenly the "Bergen Scene" was a recognized term among music lovers all over the world. Throughout the nineties, most of these artists continued their successful careers, but another important thing happened too: the success of these artists gave the whole scene a huge confidence boost and, as a result, a new wave of great artists and labels quickly emerged.

There are so many names that all of them can't be mentioned here but artists and bands like Sondre Lerche, Datarock, Magnet, Ane Brun (who relocated to Sweden early in her career) and eventually Casiokids, Matias Tellez and Ungdomskulen all represented "the second wave" of talent from this small scene.

Artists connected to Tellé 
 Kings of Convenience
 Röyksopp
 Ralph Myerz and the Jack Herren Band
 Annie
 Bjørn Torske
 Erlend Øye
 Rubies
 Familjen
 King Midas
 Evil Tordivel
 Razika

Other artists 
 Pogo Pops
 Poor Rich Ones
 Ephemera
 Sondre Lerche
 Magnet
 Nathalie Nordnes
 Kakkmaddafakka
 Casiokids
 Fjorden Baby!
 John Olav Nilsen & Gjengen
 Lars Vaular
 Young Dreams
 Real Ones
 popium
 Sister sonny

See also
 Tromsø techno scene

References

External links
 Interview with Mikal Telle

Music in Bergen